4-Fluorobenzoic acid (p-fluorobenzoic acid) is an organic compound with the formula C7H5FO2.  This colourless solid is a derivative of benzoic acid carboxylic acid.  It is a synthetic intermediate.

Preparation
4-Fluorobenzoic acid is commercially available. It may be prepared via the Schiemann reaction, in which a 4-aminobenzoic acid, protected as the ethyl ester, is diazotised and then fluoride introduced using tetrafluoroborate. Hydrolysis of the ester converts it back to the free acid.

4-Fluorobenzoic acid has been observed to form by the aerobic biotransformation of 4-fluorocinnamic acid.

See also 
 2-Fluorobenzoic acid, the ortho isomer
 3-Fluorobenzoic acid, the meta isomer

References

Benzoic acids
Fluoroarenes